Darryn Anthony (born December 18, 1985) is a South African weightlifter. Anthony represented South Africa at the 2008 Summer Olympics in Beijing, where he competed for the men's middleweight category (77 kg). Anthony placed twenty-second in this event, as he successfully lifted 135 kg in the single-motion snatch, and hoisted 160 kg in the two-part, shoulder-to-overhead clean and jerk, for a total of 295 kg.

References

External links
NBC Olympics Profile

South African male weightlifters
1985 births
Living people
Olympic weightlifters of South Africa
Weightlifters at the 2008 Summer Olympics